Justice Goldthwaite may refer to:

George Goldthwaite, chief justice of the Supreme Court of Alabama
Henry Goldthwaite, associate justice of the Supreme Court of Alabama